Terrance Michael McDermott (born March 20, 1951) is a former first baseman in Major League Baseball. He was drafted by the Los Angeles Dodgers in the 1st round of the 1969 MLB Draft and played in nine games for them during the 1972 baseball season.

Following his playing days, McDermott was a popular sports broadcaster in Albuquerque at KGGM-TV from 1980 to 1985 and then KOAT-TV from 1985 to 1997. He now works as a spokesman for Intel in Albuquerque.

References

External links

Living people
1951 births
Baseball players from New York (state)
Major League Baseball first basemen
Los Angeles Dodgers players
Ogden Dodgers players
Daytona Beach Dodgers players
Albuquerque Dodgers players
El Paso Dodgers players
Albuquerque Dukes players
Waterbury Dodgers players
People from Rockville Centre, New York